Haluk Kırcı (born 1958) is a Turkish militant, who was involved in the Susurluk scandal.

His father and mother were Şükrü and Hafize, respectively.

Known among the ultra-nationalist activists (Grey Wolves) under the nickname "Idi Amin", he was wanted for the assassination of Public Deputy Prosecutor Doğan Öz in Ankara on 24 March 1978 and killing seven student members of the Worker's Party of Turkey (TİP) in Bahçelievler, Ankara by strangling, on October 9, 1978, better known as the Bahçelievler massacre.
He was captured with a fake identity document in İstanbul on September 8, 1978 and brought to Ankara.

In 1986, he applied to the Public Prosecution Office in order to benefit from the provisions of the Act 3419. He accepted responsibility for the Bahçelievler massacre in his testimony, but he did not add any new information. He was sentenced to execution seven times, but as a right-wing militant his sentence wasn't carried out and converted to ten years of prison time for each murder he committed. In contrast, Erdal Eren was executed a few years ago due to an alleged murder despite being seventeen years old at the time.

On July 16, 1989, he attempted to escape from Bursa Prison with a fake ID on the name of Ali Ekinci during an open visit. On April 26, 1991, he was conditionally released from Bursa Prison.

In 1991, certain intelligence was received, according to which he would go to Germany to join the administration of the Turkish Federation.

Haluk Kırcı has a remarkable influence among the ultra-nationalist activists and relations to persons at the top level of the Nationalist Movement Party (MHP).

On May 28, 2010 he was released from prison again.

Notes

References
  (contains the Susurluk reports in English)

1958 births
Living people
People from Erzurum
Grey Wolves (organization) members
Turkish people convicted of murder
Susurluk scandal